William Kemmey (21 July 1912 – 18 June 1987) was an English cricketer.  Kemmey was a right-handed batsman who fielded as a wicket-keeper.  He was born at Atcham, Shropshire.

Kemmey made his first-class debut for Northamptonshire against Sussex in the 1939 County Championship.  He made four further first-class appearances that season, the last of which came against Worcestershire.  In his five first-class matches, he scored 55 runs at an average of 6.87, with a high score of 18, while behind the stumps he took 4 catches and made 2 stumpings.

He died at Shrewsbury, Shropshire on 18 June 1987.

References

External links
William Kemmey at ESPNcricinfo
William Kemmey at CricketArchive

1912 births
1987 deaths
Sportspeople from Shropshire
English cricketers
Northamptonshire cricketers
Wicket-keepers